Richmond—South Delta was a federal electoral district in the province of British Columbia, Canada, that was represented in the House of Commons of Canada between 1979 and 1988.

History

This riding was created in 1976 from parts of Burnaby—Richmond—Delta riding.

Members of Parliament

This riding elected the following Member of Parliament:

Election results

See also 

 List of Canadian federal electoral districts
 Past Canadian electoral districts

External links 

 Website of the Parliament of Canada
 Elections Canada riding history: Richmond—South Delta

Former federal electoral districts of British Columbia
Politics of Delta, British Columbia
Politics of Richmond, British Columbia